Besant is a surname. Notable people with the surname include:

Annie Besant (1847–1933), British socialist, theosophist, women's rights activist, writer and orator
Derek Michael Besant (born 1950), Canadian artist
Walter Besant (1836–1901), English novelist and historian
W. H. Besant (1828–1917), British mathematician

See also
Mabel Besant-Scott (1870–1952), British philosopher